Frederick Branch is the name of:
Frederick C. Branch (1922–2005), first African American officer in the United States Marine Corps

Frederick Branch may also refer to the following rail lines:
Frederick Branch (Baltimore and Ohio Railroad)
Frederick Branch (Pennsylvania Railroad)